Lipik is a town in western Slavonia, in the Požega-Slavonia County of northeastern Croatia. It is known for its spas, mineral water and Lipizzaner stables.

Settlements

The settlements included in the administrative area of Lipik include:

 Antunovac, population 363
 Bjelanovac, population 12
 Brekinska, population 126
 Brezine, population 221
 Bujavica, population 33
 Bukovčani, population 17
 Dobrovac, population 358
 Donji Čaglić, population 266
 Filipovac, population 373
 Gaj, population 324
 Gornji Čaglić, population 19
 Jagma, population 41
 Japaga, population 174
 Klisa, population 73
 Korita, population 9
 Kovačevac, population 29
 Kukunjevac, population 233
 Lipik, population 2,258
 Livađani, population 7
 Marino Selo, population 312
 Poljana, population 547
 Ribnjaci, population 34
 Skenderovci, population 4
 Strižičevac, population 18
 Subocka, population 12
 Šeovica, population 307

History
Lipik was occupied by Ottoman forces along with several other cities in Slavonia until its liberation in 1691.

In 1773, the warm waters of Lipik were described favorably by a Varaždin doctor. It continued to be used as a treatment spa for over a century, and in 1872, the first hotel was opened in the town. By 1920 the number of hotels grew to six. Spa treatment is still the major focus of economy for the town.

In the late 19th and early 20th century, Lipik was part of the Požega County of the Kingdom of Croatia-Slavonia.

Climate

Lipizzan stable 

Lipik also hosts a Lipizzan stable that had been built in 1843 under the Habsburg monarchy. It had previously enjoyed state recognition in Yugoslavia between 1938 and the 1950s, when it was closed in favor of the stable in Lipica, Slovenia. It was reopened in 1981, but then during the Croatian War of Independence the horses were evacuated and taken to Novi Sad, Serbia, where they remained until their negotiated return in 2007.

Notable natives and residents

Vladimir Velmar-Janković, Serb writer
Jadranka Kosor, former Croatian Prime Minister

References

External links
 

 
Slavonia
Cities and towns in Croatia
Populated places in Požega-Slavonia County
Spa towns in Croatia
1517 establishments in Europe
16th-century establishments in Croatia